Tony Jones (born 1 October 1961) is an Australian sports presenter and journalist, based in Melbourne.

Jones is currently the sport presenter Nine News Melbourne on weeknights. He also hosts the network's Australian Open coverage.

Career
Jones studied at a radio school before beginning his career in radio newsrooms in country Victoria and Melbourne's 3AW. He joined the Nine Network in May 1986, making the move from news into sport.

Jones began presenting weekend sports bulletins in 1988 and moved to weeknight sports presenting in 1990.

He is also a fill-in presenter for Peter Hitchener on Nine News Melbourne.

In his career, Jones has been most noted for his work with the Nine Network in Australia, as a sports reporter for Nine News and hosting The Sunday Footy Show between 2006 and 2008, before returning as host in 2017.  He is the weeknight sport presenter for Nine News Melbourne.

He has been a boundary rider during Nine's AFL coverage between 2002 and 2006 and has co-hosted Prime Time Sport Interactive with Michael Christian on Radio Sport National from March 2010.

He was part of the network's 2006 Melbourne Commonwealth Games coverage.

In February 2010, Jones covered the Winter Olympics in Vancouver for the Nine Network.

On 5 May 2011, he celebrated 25 years with the Nine Network.

In 2013, Jones asked Rebecca Judd if she'd like to "come 'round for a barbie" on live news. Judd simply responded, "No, thanks". The clip went viral.

In 2016, Jones tried to kiss Rebecca Judd's cheek on live TV to send her off for maternity leave, but Judd infamously rejected his advance. The original clip of the incident also went viral and has since garnered more than a million views on YouTube alone.

Despite the awkward incidents, Judd harboured no ill will, eventually planting a kiss on Jones at the 2018 Brownlow Medal red carpet.

Despite the prevalence of it, he does not like the nickname "Chompers" or its many variations; this is a reference to his artificially whitened teeth.

Jones is also a fill in presenter on 3AW.

In 2018, it was announced Jones would once again be part of the National Wide World of Sports team, as a host at the Australian Open, with colleagues James Bracey and Rebecca Maddern from 2019.

In January 2019, the Nine Network announced that Jones would present sport on Today replacing Tim Gilbert. He remained in the position until November, resigning due to having too many commitments.

References
 

Nine News presenters
Australian television journalists
Australian rules football commentators
1961 births
Living people